is a former Japanese football player. His brother is Takuya Sasagaki.

Club statistics

References

External links

1985 births
Living people
Osaka Gakuin University alumni
Association football people from Shizuoka Prefecture
Japanese footballers
J2 League players
Ehime FC players
Association football forwards